is a passenger railway station in located in the town of Inami, Hidaka District, Wakayama Prefecture, Japan, operated by West Japan Railway Company (JR West).

Lines

Station layout
The station consists of two opposed side platform s connected to the station building by a footbridge. The station is unattended.

Platforms

Adjacent stations

|-
!colspan=5|West Japan Railway Company (JR West)

History
Kirime Station opened on September 21, 1931. With the privatization of the Japan National Railways (JNR) on April 1, 1987, the station came under the aegis of the West Japan Railway Company.

Passenger statistics
In fiscal 2019, the station was used by an average of 60 passengers daily (boarding passengers only).

Surrounding Area
 
 Kirime Elementary School
 Inami Municipal Kirime Junior High School
 Kirime Post Office

See also
List of railway stations in Japan

References

External links

 Kirime Station Official Site

Railway stations in Wakayama Prefecture
Railway stations in Japan opened in 1931
Inami, Wakayama